Carmen is an unincorporated community in Lemhi County, Idaho, United States. Carmen has a post office with ZIP code 83462.

History
Carmen's population was estimated at 200 in 1909, and was 10 in 1960.

Climate
This climatic region is typified by large seasonal temperature differences, with warm to hot (and often humid) summers and cold (sometimes severely cold) winters.  According to the Köppen Climate Classification system, Carmen has a humid continental climate, abbreviated "Dfb" on climate maps.

References

Unincorporated communities in Lemhi County, Idaho
Unincorporated communities in Idaho